The South China Athletic Association Men's Basketball Team (SCAA Basketball Team), commonly known as South China, is one of the basketball teams of South China Athletic Association in Hong Kong playing in A1 Division of the Hong Kong Basketball League.

Honours

Hong Kong Basketball A1 Division
Winners (13): 1954-55, 1957-58, 1959-60, 1984, 1985, 1986, 2004, 2005, 2008, 2012, 2013, 2016, 2017, 2022
Hong Kong Senior Silver Shield
Winners (13): 1958-1960, 1985, 1987, 2004, 2005, 2008, 2009, 2010, 2012, 2013, 2015
Straits Cup
Winners (2): 2008, 2010
Hong Kong Basketball A2 Division
Winners (1): 2002

Notable players

- Set a club record or won an individual award as a professional player.
- Played at least one official international match for his senior national team at any time.
  Duncan Reid
  Lin Ho Chun
  Lo Yi Ting
  Shiu Wah Leung
  Trevor Watts

References

External links
  

Basketball teams established in 1932
Basketball teams in Hong Kong
 
Basketball
Wan Chai District